Coade is a surname. Notable people with the surname include:

Caroline Coade, American violist
Eleanor Coade (1733–1821), British businesswoman
Peter Coade (born 1942), Canadian broadcast weather presenter
Thorold Coade (1896–1963), British school teacher and headmaster
Coade Hall